Protoma is a genus of sea snails, marine gastropod mollusks in the family Turritellidae.

Species
Extant species within the genus Protoma include:
 Protoma knockeri Baird, 1870
 Species brought into synonymy
 Protoma capensis (Krauss, 1848): synonym of Turritella capensis (Krauss, 1848)

Extinct species
† Protoma cathedralis  Brongniart 1856
† Protoma deshayesi  d'Archiac 1850
† Protoma renevieri  d'Archiac and Haime 1854
† Protoma retrodilatatum  Vredenburg 1928
† Protoma rotifera  Deshayes 1832
† Protoma sindiense  Vredenburg 1928
† Protoma subrenevieri  Vredenburg 1928

Fossils of sea snails within this genus have been found in sediments of Europe, South Africa, India, and Pakistan from Oligocene to Quaternary (age range: 28.4 to 0.012 million years ago).

References

 Vaught, K.C. (1989). A classification of the living Mollusca. American Malacologists: Melbourne, FL (USA). . XII, 195 pp.
  Branch, G.M. et al. (2002). Two Oceans. 5th impression. David Philip, Cate Town & Johannesburg

Protoma
Monotypic gastropod genera
Extant Oligocene first appearances